Youcef Dris (born 15 October 1945, in Tizi Ouzou) is an Algerian writer and journalist.

He started as a journalist in 1970 writing publications for El Moujahid. Afterwards, he became Editor in chief of the press group West Oran Tribune. He directed two cultural weeklies. The author recently published, in 2013, a new historical essay titled "Le Combat des justes" (The battle of the just), published by El Ibriz in Algiers. The essay is an homage to the French who participated in the war of Algeria in the ranks of the National Liberation Front.

Works

Essay
 Les Massacres d'octobre 1961 (2009)
Le Combat des Justes (2013)

Novels
 Les Amants de Padovani (2004)
 Affaires criminelles. Histoires Vraies ( 2006)
 Biographie de Guerouabi (2008)
 Destin à l'encre noire (2012)
 "Le puits confisqué" (2010)

Poetry
 Grisaille (1993)
 Gravelures (2009)

References

1945 births
Living people
Algerian journalists
Algerian essayists
20th-century Algerian poets
Algerian writers in French
People from Tizi Ouzou
21st-century Algerian poets
Algerian male poets
20th-century essayists
21st-century essayists
20th-century male writers
21st-century male writers